Mavrodaphni, Mavrodaphne, or Mavrodafni (Greek: Μαυροδάφνη lit. 'black laurel') is both a black wine grape indigenous to the Achaea region in Northern Peloponnese, Greece, and the sweet, fortified wine first produced from it by Gustav Clauss in around 1850.

Winemaking

Mavrodaphni is initially vinified in large vats exposed to the sun. Once the wine reaches a certain level of maturity, fermentation is stopped by adding distillate prepared from previous vintages. Then the Mavrodaphni distillate and the wine, still containing residual sugar, is transferred to the underground cellars to complete its maturation. There it is "educated" by contact with older wine using the solera method of serial blending. Once aged, the wine is bottled and sold as a dessert wine under the Mavrodaphni Protected designation of origin.

Wine
Mavrodaphni is a dark, almost opaque wine with a dark purple reflected color and a purple-brown transmitted color. It presents aromas and flavors of caramel, chocolate, coffee, raisins and plums.

History
Mavrodaphne literally means "black laurel". The name was chosen by Gustav Clauss, the founder of  the Achaia Clauss winery, because of the berries' resemblance to those of the laurel, though there are various stories about a lover, fiancée, or wife named Daphne, who had black eyes or who died.

References

External links 
CHRIS Distillery 
Mavrodaphne of Patras CHRIS

Fortified wine
Grape varieties of Greece
Red wine grape varieties
Appellations
Greek products with protected designation of origin
Peloponnese wine
Economy of Patras
Culture in Patras